The 8th Marine Infantry Parachute Regiment ({{lang-fr|8e Régiment de Parachutistes d'Infanterie de Marine, (8e RPIMa) is an airborne regiment of the French Army. The 8e RPIMa was created on 28 February 1951 and the men wear the red beret. It is part of the 11th Parachute Brigade.

The regiment is garrisoned at Castres, France. Current missions of the 8e RPIMa revolve around peacekeeping and assistance to world populations, and in that regard at the service and disposition of NATO or the United Nations directives. The regiment intervenes around the world protecting French interests in and not limited to: Tchad, Lebanon, New Caledonia, Kuwait, Rwanda, Gabon, Kurdistan, Zaïre, Central African Republic, Congo-Brazzaville, RDC, ex-Yugoslavia, Cambodia, Macedonia, Kosovo, Ivory Coast, and Afghanistan. In outremer, the regiment is engaged in operations defending French interests, or countries that are in liaison with France in security missions. In Europe, the regiment is engaged in defending the national French territory at the corps of the terrestrial action force. This regiment can be rapidly deployed anywhere in the world. The regiment parts various Commando Parachute Groups, a group of French elite units. Parachute training is conducted at the École des troupes aéroportées (ETAP) in Pau.

Creation and different nominations since 1951 

 28 February 1951 : creation of the 8th Colonial Parachute Battalion, 8e BPC.
 12 September 1952 : became the 8th Commando Parachute Groupment, 8e GCP.
 1 August 1953 : became the 8th Parachute Choc Battalion, 8e BPC.
 31 May 1954 : dissolution of the 8th Parachute Choc Battalion, 8e BPC.
 1 May 1956 : creation of the 8th Colonial Parachute Regiment 8e RCP at the corps of the 25th Parachute Division 25e DP.
 1 December 1958: became 8th Marine Infantry Parachute Regiment, 8e RPIMa.

Campaigns 
{|
|-
| valign=top |
Campaign 
8th Colonial Parachute Battalion
(1951–1954)
 1951–1954 : Indochina War
Campaign Participation Engagement 
8th Colonial Parachute Regiment
(1956–1958) 
 1956–1961 : Algerian War
Campaign Participation Engagement 
8th Marine Infantry Parachute Regiment
(1958–present )
 1970 : Chad
 1978–1979: Lebanon, UNIFIL
 1979: Chad, Opération Tacaud 
| valign=top |
 1980 : New Hebrides with Royal Marines
 1982 : Lebanon, UNIFIL
 1983 : Chad, Operation Manta
 1982–1983 : Lebanon, Multinational Force in Lebanon
 1984 : Chad
 1986 : New Caledonia
 1986 : Chad, Opération Épervier
 1988 : New Caledonia
 1989 : Chad, Opération Épervier
 1990 : Gabon, Opération Requin
 1991 : Kuwait
 1991 : Kurdistan
| valign=top |
 1991–1992: Zaire
 1992 : Cambodia
 1993 : Central African Republic, RCA
 1993–1995 : Sarajevo
 1995 : Tahiti
 1996–1997 : RCA 
 1996 : Sarajevo 
 1997 : DRC
 1997 : Congo-Brazzaville
 1998 : Macedonia
| valign=top |
 1999 : Kosovo
 2002 : Kosovo 
 2002 : Ivory Coast, Opération Licorne
 2003–2005 : Kosovo 
 2006–2007 : DRC 
 2008–2009 : Afghanistan
 2010–2011 : Kosovo with 1er RHP and 17e RGP
 2013–2014 : RCA 
|}

The unit was created on 28 February 1951, in Hanoi as the "8th Colonial Parachute Battalion", as a part of the French union forces. Present since 1951 and to 1954, the "8th Colonial Parachute Battalion" fought at Lai-Chau, Hòa Bình, Langson and Dien Bien Phu heavily superiorly outnumbered. The Battalion was cited at the orders of the armed forces and mentioned in dispatches four times for acts of valor. The quasi totality of the battalion disappeared and was subsequently dissolved on 19 May 1954, after the Battle of Dien Bien Phu.

The unit was recreated as the "8th Colonial Parachute Regiment" on 1 May 1956. The regiment participated in operations against the Algerian National Liberation Front (FLN), most notably at El Kiffene, Ain El Kesseub and Tarf at the corps of the 25th Parachute Division.

 8th Marine Infantry Parachute Regiment (1958 – present) 

The regiment relocated to the town of Nancy, Metropolitan France, in 1961, to form part of the 11th Light Intervention Division. The regimental headquarters moved to Castres in 1963.

The regiment took part in various peacekeeping missions in Lebanon on numerous yearly designated occasions within the UNIFIL first then joined the Multinational Force in Lebanon.

The regiment has been present around the world in Lebanon, Chad, Central Africa, Gabon and many others while mainly participating in humanitarian and peacekeeping missions.

The regiment has been spearheading combat, combat support, peacekeeping and multipurposed facade mission operations throughout the globe with the ongoing War on Terror, mainly on all exterior theatres of operations where the French Armed Forces are engaged in along the five continents and oceanic surroundings. The regiment served with the NATO ISAF in Afghanistan. In a fierce battle on 18–19 August 2008, ten French soldiers were killed and 21 wounded making it the largest loss of French troops in battle in many years.

 Composition 
The regiment is composed of around 1200 marine infantry parachute personnel in eight combat companies:

 Compagnie de commandement et de logistique (CCL) – Command and logistics company
 Compagnie d'éclairage et d'appui (CEA) – Reconnaissance and support company
 1re Compagnie de combat – 1st Combat company
 2e Compagnie de combat – 2nd Combat company
 3e Compagnie de combat – 3rd Combat company
 4e Compagnie de combat – 4th Combat company
 Compagnie de réserve opérationnelle (CRO) – Operational reserve company

 Traditions 

French army metropolitan and marine paratroopers forming the 11th Parachute Brigade wear the Red Beret.

The Archangel Saint Michael, patron of the French paratroopers is celebrated on 29 September.

The prière du Para (Prayer of the Paratrooper) was written by André Zirnheld in 1938.

 Insignias 
Just like the paratrooper Brevet of the French Army; the Insignia of French Paratroopers was created in 1946. The French Army Insignia of metropolitan Paratroopers represents a closed "winged armed dextrochere", meaning a "right winged arm" armed with a sword pointing upwards. The Insignia makes reference to the Patron of Paratroopers. In fact, the Insignia represents "the right Arm of Saint Michael", the Archangel which according to Liturgy is the "Armed Arm of God". This Insignia is the symbol of righteous combat and fidelity to superior missions. The French Army Insignia of Marine Infantry Paratroopers is backgrounded by a Marine Anchor.

 Regimental Colors 

Since creation, the regiment has endured the loss of 19 Officers, 91 Sous-Officiers and 437 paratroopers of the 8e RPIMa.

 Decorations 
The regimental colors are decorated with:

 Croix de guerre des théâtres d'opérations extérieures with :
 4 palms 
 Croix de la Valeur militaire with :
 1 palm (21 May 2012 for service in Afghanistan).
 1 palm (31 August 2012 for service in Lebanon – Regularization of the citation at the orders of the armed forces received in 1979).
 1 palm (1 October 2013 for service in Afghanistan).
 Fourragère with colors of la Croix de la Valeur militaire.

The regiment bears wearing 3 Fourragère:
 Fourragère bearing the colors of the Médaille militaire.
 Fourragère bearing the colors of the Croix de guerre des théâtres d'opérations extérieures.
 Fourragère bearing the colors of the Croix de la Valeur militaire.

 Honors 
 Battle honors 
 INDOCHINE 1951–1954
 AFN 1952–1962

 Regimental Commanders 
{|
|-
| valign=top |8th Colonial Parachute Battalion8th Commando Parachute Groupment8th Parachute Choc Battalion Captain Gautier (1951–1952)
 Captain Guy Le Borgne (1952–1953)
 Captain Pierre Tourret (1953–1954)
 Lieutenant Colonel Kohler (1954–1955)8th Colonial Parachute Regiment Colonel Louis Fourcade (1956–1958)
| valign=top |8th Marine Infantry Parachute Regiment, 8e RPIMa Lieutenant Colonel Hubert de Seguins-Pazzis (1958–1960)
 Lieutenant Colonel Albert Lenoir (1960–1961)
 Lieutenant Colonel Kohler (1961–1963)
 Lieutenant Colonel Desfarges (1963–1965)
 Lieutenant Colonel Drouin (1965–1967)
 Lieutenant Colonel Mourier (1967–1969)
 Lieutenant Colonel Guilleminot (1969–1971)
 Lieutenant Colonel Bellamy (1971–1973)
 Lieutenant Colonel Dominique (1973–1975)
 Colonel Maurice Schmitt (1975–1977)

| valign=top |8th Marine Infantry Parachute Regiment, 8e RPIMa' Lieutenant Colonel François Cann (1977–1979)
 Lieutenant Colonel Vidal (1979–1981)
 Lieutenant Colonel Zeisser (1981–1983)
 Lieutenant Colonel Lepage (1983–1985)
 Lieutenant Colonel Theodoly-Lannes (1985–1987)
 Colonel Lafourcade (1987–1989)
 Lieutenant Colonel Thomann (1989–1991)
 Lieutenant Colonel Elrick Irastorza (1991–1993)
 Lieutenant Colonel de Haynin de Bry (1993–1995)
 Lieutenant Colonel Reglat (1995–1997)
| valign=top |
 Lieutenant Colonel de Braquilanges (1997–1999)
 Colonel Michel Stollsteiner (1999–2001)
 Colonel Bosser (2001–2003)
 Colonel Brousse (2003–2005)
 Colonel Guionie (2005–2007)
 Colonel Jacques Aragones (2007–2009)
 Colonel Philippe du Chaxel (2009–2011)
 Colonel Eric Chasboeuf (2011–2013)
 Colonel Tassel (2013–2015)
 Colonel Danigo (2015–2017) 
 Colonel Debray (2017–2019) 
 Colonel Prod'homme (2019-202.)

 Honorary Regimental Arms Celebration 
 The regiment distinguished savoire-faire in Indochina. The regiment received 4 citations at the orders of the armed forces for acts of valor.
 In Algeria, the regiment placed out of combat 2800 militants and recuperated 1000 arms.
 In 1978 and commanded by colonel Cann, the regiment was engaged in total in Lebanon in support of the peace effort. The regiment received the 5th citation at the orders of the armed forces.
 In 1979 and commanded by captain Marchand, a company from the regiment was engaged fully in Chad.
 In 2008, the regiment endured the loss of eight 8e RPIMa paratroopers fighting in Afghanistan.
 In 2013, the regiment endured the loss of two paratroopers in RCA.

 Notable members of the regiment 

 Guy Le Borgne, regimental commander (1952–1953)
 Patrice Le Nepvou de Carfort (1952–1959)
 René de Salins (1920–2014)
 Pierre Tourret, regimental commander (1953–1954)
 François Cann, regimental commander ( 1977–1979)
 Maurice Amiot

 References 

 Sources and bibliographies 
 Collectif, Histoire des parachutistes français, Société de Production Littéraire, 1975.
 Frédéric Pons, Opérations extérieures – Les volontaires du 8e RPIMa, Lebanon 1978 – Afghanistan 2009, Presses de la Cité, June 25, 2009
 Dossier « Le 8e RPIMa : Régiment du Tarn », in Revue du Tarn'', numéro 227, automne 2012, p. 393-552

External links 
 Official site – 8e RPIMa

Parachute infantry regiments of France
Marines regiments of France
20th-century regiments of France
21st-century regiments of France
Military units and formations of the War in Afghanistan (2001–2021)
Military units and formations established in 1951
1951 establishments in France